Fabrizio Di Bella (born 2 March 1988) is an Italian footballer who plays as a defender for Vigor Lamezia, an Italian team of Lamezia Terme.

Career
Di Bella was signed by A.S. Livorno Calcio in August 2008; he was loaned back to Potenza for a season.

He made his Livorno debut on 18 September 2010, in a 0–0 draw at home to Portogruaro.

In 2012, he joined Barletta. Although the deal was initially announced as a temporary deal, Livorno announced in their financial report that the club wrote down the residual value of Di Bella's contract (which lasted until  30 June 2013) for €103,000. In July 2013 Barletta announced that Di Bella would remain with the club for another season.

References

External links
 Player Profile from livornocalcio.it
 Player Profile from legaserieb.it

1988 births
Living people
Italian footballers
U.S. Livorno 1915 players
Piacenza Calcio 1919 players
A.S.D. Barletta 1922 players
Vigor Lamezia players

Association football defenders